St Catharine's School for Girls, Kwun Tong is located in Hong Lee Road, Kwun Tong, Hong Kong. It is a girls' secondary school.

History 
The school was established by its first principal, The Rev. Joyce M. Bennett, who was contacted by the Educational Department in 1965. Ms. Bennett first visited the school site at Ngok Yue Shan in late 1965. As the government first requested an establishment of 24 classes in the school, Ms. Bennett then planned to set up four different subjects (Arts, Science, Commerce and Technical) to satisfy the government. Ms. Bennett retired in 1983.

The school name 
The name originally proposed for the school was "St. Anne's", St Anne being the mother of the Blessed Virgin Mary. But the Chinese members of the school organizing committee thought that the name is not good when translated into Chinese. After a long search, Ms, Bennett proposed the name "St. Catharine's", after Catherine of Alexandria, the patroness of young women, wheelwrights, attorneys, and scholars. She was considered to be a particularly appropriate model for a school which was to combine academic and technical education. St Catherine's feast day, 25 November, was considered a suitable day for school celebration.

Principals
Joyce Bennett (1968–1983)
Lau Li Kwok Kin, Clara (1983–1993)
Sun Pong Tak Ling (1993–2008)
Ip Au Tak Hing (January – August 1994, September 2005 – July 2006)
Heung Yuk Mui, Astella (2008–present)

Class names 
The school set up five Form One classes in September 1968. As Ms. Bennett thought it is unwise to name the five classes with ‘A’ to ‘E’ since people may think the classes are ranked according to the students' capability, she eventually picked five women from the New Testament as the names of the classes:
Mary (Magdalene): a woman who was attentive to the teaching of Jesus,
Martha: a busy cook,
Dorcas: a seamstress,
Priscilla: a tent-maker, and
Phoebe: a deaconess
These women were all considered good role models for the girls.

Before the year of 2009, there was one more class name of "Ruth" (Ruth was a Jewish woman whose story is found in the Old Testament) for form 1 to form 5. This class name was removed due to shrinking the number of classes of each form.

References

External links

Christian schools in Hong Kong
Girls' schools in Hong Kong
Educational institutions established in 1968
Kwun Tong
Protestant secondary schools in Hong Kong
Anglican schools in Hong Kong